Bob Grant (born October 14, 1946) is a former American football linebacker in the National Football League for the Baltimore Colts and the Washington Redskins.  He played college football at Wake Forest University and was drafted in the second round of the 1968 NFL Draft.

1946 births
Living people
American football linebackers
Wake Forest Demon Deacons football players
Baltimore Colts players
Washington Redskins players